Loik Le Floch-Prigent (born 21 September 1943 in Brest) is a French engineer and manager. He was CEO of Elf Aquitaine between July 1989 and 1993, then president of SNCF from December 1995 to July 1996, when he was indicted in connection with the Elf affair
. He is the nephew of the poet Maodez Glanndour.

He was charged in September 2012 with being an accessory to fraud whilst in Togo after a complaint from an Emirati businessman, was filed claiming that he had been manipulated out of $48 million. He was extradited to Ivory Coast and appeared before a judge where he was questioned for three hours in Lomé.

References

French businesspeople
French chief executives
SNCF people
TotalEnergies people
1943 births
Living people
French people imprisoned abroad
People extradited from Togo
People extradited to Ivory Coast
People from Brest, France
French people of Breton descent